Heteropodagrion superbum is a species of damselfly in the family Thaumatoneuridae. It is found in Central America and South America.

References

Further reading

 

Calopterygoidea
Articles created by Qbugbot
Insects described in 1918